Barkhera Assembly constituency is one of the 403 constituencies of the Uttar Pradesh Legislative Assembly, India. It is a part of the Pilibhit district and one of the five assembly constituencies in the Pilibhit Lok Sabha constituency. First election in this assembly constituency was held in 1967 after the "DPACO (1967)" (delimitation order) was passed in 1967. After the "Delimitation of Parliamentary and Assembly Constituencies Order" was passed in 2008, the constituency was assigned identification number 128.

Wards  / Areas
Extent of Barkhera Assembly constituency is KCs Neoria, Pauta Kalan & Nyoria Husainpur NP of Pilibhit Tehsil; KC Barkhera & Barkhera NP of Bisalpur Tehsil; PCs Athkona, Abhaipur M.Shahgarh, Karnapur, Itauria J.Biharipur, Dhakia Kesherpur, Shivnagar, Piparia Karam, Pachpera Prahladpur, Pachpera Garha, Prasadpur, Lalpur T.Madhautanda, Burhia J.Itauria, Raipur M.Rampur, Rampura M. Bhabsi, Shahgar & Sandai of West KC of Puranpur Tehsil.

Members of the Legislative Assembly

2022

2012 General Election results

See also
Pilibhit district
Pilibhit Lok Sabha constituency
Sixteenth Legislative Assembly of Uttar Pradesh
Uttar Pradesh Legislative Assembly
Vidhan Bhawan

References

External links
 

Assembly constituencies of Uttar Pradesh
Pilibhit district
Constituencies established in 1967